Rakshak is an Indian Hindi-language action thriller film.

Rakshak may also refer to:

 Rakshak, original tentative title of Dhruva (2016 film), an Indian Telugu-language action thriller
 Rakshak, an Indian TV drama broadcast by Life OK
 Rakshak (album), by Indian folk metal band Bloodywood
 Mahindra Rakshak, armoured light military vehicle from Mahindra
 Operation Rakshak, 1994 Indian military anti-terrorist operation in Kashmir

See also 

 Protector (disambiguation), an English translation of rakshak
 Defender (disambiguation), an English translation of rakshak
 Savior (disambiguation), an English translation of rakshak